Ayman El Mizzayn is an Egyptian football manager. In 2020 he was appointed as head coach of Tanta SC.

Managerial statistics

References

Living people
Egyptian football managers
1971 births